Kill Switch (stylized as  kill.switch) is a third-person shooter video game developed by Namco USA in 2003 for the PlayStation 2, Xbox and Microsoft Windows. A Game Boy Advance port was released in 2004. The GBA port was created independently of Namco, due to a licensing deal with Destination Software. The PAL release of the PS2 port came with a demo of SOCOM II U.S. Navy SEALs on a separate disc. 

The most distinguishing characteristic of Kill Switch is its cover system, a mechanic that has the player character taking cover behind objects and around corners in a manner similar to Namco's own Time Crisis series of light gun shooters as well as Koei's third-person shooter WinBack and Hideo Kojima's stealth game Metal Gear Solid 2: Sons of Liberty. However, Kill Switch was the first third-person shooter to feature the cover system as its core game mechanic, though Gears of War would popularize it.

Story
Protagonist Nick Bishop (voiced by Marcus McCollum) is a super-soldier remotely controlled via direct neural connection by a man known only as "Controller" (voiced by Chuck McQuary) in a series of combat missions designed to bring "the North" and "the West" to war. Profiteer Archer (voiced by Adam Baldwin) plans to benefit by selling the technology used to control Bishop, who gives Controller headaches on recollection of suppressed memories featuring a woman and the phrase "Say my name". Moments before launching a biological warhead, Controller is killed by a surge triggered when a woman known as "Duchess" (voiced by Adrienne Wilkinson) seizes control of Bishop. Sent to attack Controller's base, Bishop's memories are eventually restored: the woman from his memories was his new wife, who Archer killed when he captured Bishop to sell the technology inside him. Freed, Bishop kills Archer in a final assault and walks away.

Reception

Kill Switch received a wide range of reviews across all platforms, with the Xbox version receiving a score of 75 out of 100 on Metacritic, indicating "generally favorable reviews", while the PC and PS2 versions received scores of 66 and 73 out of 100 respectively, indicating "mixed or average reviews". Criticism was directed towards its thin plot and simplistic level design, while the gameplay mechanics, especially the cover system, were lauded and considered engaging. It was compared to the Time Crisis series. The Xbox version of the game was said to possess enhanced graphics over the PS2 version. GameSpot awarded the Xbox version a 6.9 out of 10.

The GBA version of the game was similarly received, with IGN calling it a "solid portable action title" and awarding it a 7.5 out of 10.

Legacy

Kill Switch is best remembered for its cover system as a core game mechanic, and for introducing the blind fire mechanic to the cover system. Several shooters took inspiration from Kill Switch and implemented similar cover systems. In the design of Gears of War, lead developer Cliff Bleszinski of Epic Games credits Kill Switch's cover system as one of the influences they put into the game's design, as Kill Switch's lead designer Chris Esaki was employed by Epic Games and was involved in the development of Gears of War.

Naughty Dog's Uncharted: Drake's Fortune, which began development in 2005 and was released in 2007, also took inspiration from Kill Switch, which Uncharted's lead designers Evan Wells and Amy Hennig credited as inspiration for the game's cover system. Other examples of shooters that featured Kill Switch-inspired cover systems include the 2005 third-person shooter CT Special Forces: Fire for Effect, and the 2006 games Tom Clancy's Rainbow Six: Vegas, a first-person shooter released in the same month as Gears of War, and Killzone: Liberation, an isometric shoot 'em up released a month before Gears of War.

References

External links
 GameRankings PC reviews
 GameRankings PS2 reviews
 GameRankings Xbox reviews
 GameRankings GBA reviews

2003 video games
Destination Software games
Game Boy Advance games
Namco games
PlayStation 2 games
RenderWare games
Third-person shooters
Video games scored by Kevin Manthei
Video games developed in the United States
Video games set in the Middle East
Video games set in North Korea
Windows games
Xbox games